Povolide  may refer to:
 Povolide, Portugal, a parish in the Viseu municipality
 a synonym for the Portuguese Baga grape variety